The 2010 Final Four Women's Volleyball Cup was the third edition of the annual women's volleyball tournament, played by four countries from September 21–25, 2010 in Tuxtla Gutiérrez, Chiapas, Mexico. The teams qualified through the 2010 Pan-American Cup, held in Rosarito and Tijuana, Mexico.

Competing nations

Squads

Preliminary round

|}

Final round

Bronze medal match

Final

Final ranking

Individual awards

Most Valuable Player
 Dahiana Burgos
Best Scorer
 Dahiana Burgos
Best Spiker
 Jessenia Uceda
Best Blocker
 Leyla Chihuán
Best Server
 Elena Keldibekova

Best Digger
 Brenda Castillo
Best Setter
 Elena Keldibekova
Best Receiver
 Vanessa Palacios
Best Libero
 Brenda Castillo

References

External links
 NORCECA Results

Final Four Women's Volleyball Cup
F
2010 in Mexican sports
International volleyball competitions hosted by Mexico
2010 in Mexican women's sports